Charles Edward Parker (1826-1890) was an American architect from Boston, Massachusetts.

Life and career
After growing up in Keene, New Hampshire, Parker moved to Boston in the 1840s, where he worked for architect Gridley J. F. Bryant. Around 1846, at the young age of 20,  he established his own office. After several years of private practice, he joined the office of prominent architect Richard Bond as junior partner. The firm, Bond & Parker, existed from 1850 until 1853. He practiced alone for the rest of his career. He retired from active practice soon before his death in late 1890.

Parker was the father of the noted composer Horatio Parker, born in Auburndale in 1863. Parker's Hora Novissima, written in 1893 after his father's death, was dedicated to him. Of the influence of the father on the son, it was said that from him, "[Horatio] inherited an artistic nature and creative faculty", though his primary artistic inspiration came from his mother.

Legacy
Parker designed the Easthampton Town Hall and the Chicopee City Hall, as well as at least nine churches. Several of these, plus the City Hall in Chicopee, have been listed on the National Register of Historic Places for their architectural significance.

Architectural works

References

Architects from Boston